Keill is a Scottish family name that may refer to:

James Keill (1673–1719), Scottish physician and philosopher
Jason Keill, New Zealand musician
John Keill (1671–1721), Scottish mathematician and astronomer

See also 
Keill Randor, fictional character in Douglas Hill's The Last Legionary book series
Keeill, a chapel on the Isle of Man
Keills Chapel, Scotland
Keil (disambiguation)

Anglicised Scottish Gaelic-language surnames